Thavamai Thavamirundhu ( With much penance) is an Indian Family Sensational drama premiered on 18 April 2022 on Zee Tamil and streams on ZEE5. It stars Pasanga movie fame Sivakumar and Anitha Nair in the lead roles. The story chronicles the life of an aged couple, who provide the best for their four children.

Thavamai Thavamirundhu held a two and half hours special episode on Sunday, Feb 26th 2023 titled as 'Thavamai Thavamirundhu Sirappu Thogupu' for cooking competition between Mark and Seetha

Synopsis
Markandeyan and Seetha, who have four children Revathi, Raja, Ravi and Malar. These four has different personalities which affects their parents into humilation. Disillusioned by their children's callous attitude towards them, the old couple decides to move out of their family home and start a life

Cast
 Pasanga Sivakumar as Markandeyan: Who was leading the family; Seetha's husband; Revathi, Ravi, Raja and Malar's father 
 Anitha Nair as Seetha: Markandayen's wife; Revathi, Ravi, Raja and Malar's mother
 Sandhya Ramachandran as Malar: Markandeyan and Seetha's second daughter: Pandi's wife
 Britto Mano as Pandi: Malar's husband; second son-in-law of Markandeyan and Seetha
 Mahesh G as Raja: Markandeyan and Seetha's first son; Megala's husband
 Teenu Niroshini as Megala: Raja's wife; first daughter-in-law of Markandeyan and Seetha
 Pandi Kamal as Ravi: Markandeyan and Seetha's second son; Uma's husband
 Yalini Rajan as Uma: Ravi's wife; second daughter-in-law of Markandeyan and Seetha
 Karuna Vilasini as Revathi: Markandeyan and Seetha's first daughter; Thangaraj's wife
 Bhala Khoumhar as Thangaraj: Revathi's husband; first son-in-law of Markandeyan and Seetha
 Sangeetha Balan as Chinnathayi: Pandi's mother
 Priya as Savithri: Megala's mother
 Ramesh Sethumadhavan as Thanikachalam: Uma's Father; Ravi's Father-in-law
 Sai Shakthi as Arjun: Uma's Brother
 Gana Hari as Pachakili: Pandi's friend
 Maria Juliana as Thara (Cameo appearance) 
 Puviarasu as Iniyan (Cameo appearance) 
 Sahana Shetty (Cameo appearance)  
 Ayesha as Sathya (Cameo appearance)
 Prajin as Murugan (Cameo appearance)
 Vadivukkarasi as Chamundeshwari (Cameo appearance)

Production
The series was produced by Singaravelan under the Production Company SS Group, Where the Company previously produced ZEE5 series Mathil. Zee Tamil decide to launch this series on 11 April 2022 along with Kannathil Muthamittal, then the channel rescheduled and launched this series on 18 April 2022. The team selects actor Sivakumar for the role of Markandeyan, who popularly known for the films Pasanga and Goli Soda. Malayalam actress Anitha Nair plays Seetha, Markandeyan wife, who acted in Malayalam and Tamil series. Mahesh, Pandi Kamal, Vilasini, Sandhya and Teenu were selected for prominent roles. Initially Revathi Elango was selected in the role of Uma, during the series shoot, she quit the series for some reasons and then she was replaced by Yalini Rajan before the serial episodes telecasting. Britto Mano joins the cast as Pandi, Malar's love interest.

During Week 35 2022, it becomes No.2 Serial in Chennai Areas. During Week 36 2022, it becomes No.2 Serial in Urban and Urban+Rural Areas due to High Voltage Track. 

Thavamai Thavamirundhu bags 6 awards in Zee Kudumba Viruthugal 2022 which includes Best Actor, Best Mother, Best Comedian, People's Choice Serial of the Year, Best Director and Best Screenplay Writer.

References

External links
 
 Thavamai Thavamirundhu at ZEE5

Zee Tamil original programming
Tamil-language melodrama television series
2022 Tamil-language television series debuts
Tamil-language television soap operas
Television shows set in Tamil Nadu
Television series about families